Aleksandar Malenko (born January 20, 1979) is a retired swimmer from Macedonia. He competed for his native country at the 1996 and 2004 Summer Olympics.

References 
sports-reference

1979 births
Living people
Macedonian male freestyle swimmers
Male butterfly swimmers
Male medley swimmers
Swimmers at the 1996 Summer Olympics
Swimmers at the 2004 Summer Olympics
Macedonian male swimmers
Olympic swimmers of North Macedonia
Sportspeople from Ohrid